Franco Smith (born 3 May 2000) is a Welsh-born South African rugby union player, currently playing for United Rugby Championship side Zebre Parma. His preferred position is centre. He is the son of Italy coach Franco Smith, and Welsh and Italian qualified by birth and residency respectively.

Smith was named Permit player for Benetton for the 2021–22 season. He joined Zebre Parma on loan in May 2022. He made his debut in the re-arranged Round 12 of the 2021–22 United Rugby Championship against .

References

2000 births
Living people
South African rugby union players
Rugby Colorno players
Benetton Rugby players
Zebre Parma players
Rugby union centres